Lucy E. Salyer is a professor of history at the University of New Hampshire known for her work on the history of immigration law in the United States.

She authored Laws Harsh as Tigers: Chinese Immigrants and the Shaping of Modern Immigration Law, which won the Theodore Saloutos Book Award for the best book on immigration history. Harsh as Tigers explores the origin of American immigration law in the late 19th and early 20th century.

Under the Starry Flag: How a Band of Irish Americans Joined the Fenian Revolt and Sparked a Crisis over Citizenship (Cambridge: Belknap Press of Harvard University Press, 2018) explores the concept of legal expatriation, the idea that an individual can legally cease to be a citizen of their birth state by immigrating to and becoming a citizen of a different state.

Selected works

References

Living people
University of New Hampshire faculty
21st-century American historians
American women historians
21st-century American women
Year of birth missing (living people)